The 2018 Kite Awards (Vietnamese: Giải Cánh diều 2018) is the 26th edition of Vietnam Cinema Association Awards, also the 17th edition since the award is officially named Kite. It honored the best in Vietnam film, television works of 2018. The ceremony was broadcast live on April 12, 2019, from the Army Theatre in Southern Region,  Tân Bình District, Ho Chi Minh City beginning at 20:00. The ceremony aired live on VTV2 channel in Vietnam.

This year, a total of 144 film works from 50 film production units participated in the award, including: 14 feature films, 10 TV drama series, 3 TV single-episode drama, 61 documentaries, 14 science films, 14 animated films, 26 short films and two film studies. The organizers accept remake films based on foreign scripts, except for the best screenplay category. The shortlist of nominees was announced in the award ceremony right before the winner was declared.

My Mr. Wife were the most nominated with four, later ended up winning three, including Golden Kite Award for Best Feature Film. In television, Quỳnh the Doll and Across the River tied for the Golden Kite Award. Across the River were the most nominated with three.

Winner and nominees 
Winners are listed first, highlighted in boldface, with a dagger indicating the shortlist nominees for the Golden Kite.
Highlighted title indicates Golden Kite for the Best Film/Drama/Study winner(s).
Highlighted title indicates Silver Kite for the Second Best Film/Drama/Study winner(s).
Highlighted title indicates Film/Drama/Study(s) received the Certificate of Merit.
Other nominees

Feature film

Multiple wins 
The following films received multiple wins:

Multiple nominations 
The following films received multiple nominations:

Television film

Multiple wins 
The following films received multiple wins:

Multiple nominations 
The following films received multiple nominations:

Animated film

Multiple wins 
The following films received multiple wins:

Documentary film

Multiple wins 
The following films received multiple wins:

Science film

Multiple wins 
The following films received multiple wins:

Short film

Film critic/theory research

Ceremony

Presenters 
The following individuals presented awards at the ceremony:
Actor/model Bình Minh and singer/actress Cao Mỹ Kim with Best Supporting Actress/Actor - Television film
Event organizer Đoàn Thúy Phương and actor Quyền Linh with Best Leading Actor/Actress - Television film
Cinematographer Lý Thái Dũng and actress Khả Như with Golden Kite for Best Short film
Director Lê Hồng Chương and actress Hạnh Thúy with Golden Kite for Best Documentary film & Best Science film
Director Nguyễn Việt Hùng and singer Mi Trần with Best Director and Best Cinematography - Documentary film
Director Nguyễn Như Vũ and actress Phạm Phương Hạnh with Best Director and Best Cinematography - Science film
Director Đặng Lưu Việt Bảo and actress Xuân Văn with Best Director and Best Cinematography - Television film
Director/animator Nguyễn Hà Bắc and actress Lý Kim Dung with Best Achievements in Animated film category (Film, Director, Animator)
MC Hồng Phúc and MC Thùy Linh with Golden Kite for Best Film critic/theory research works
Composer Phó Đức Phương and singer Ái Phương with Best Original Score and Best Sound - Feature film
Bamboo Airways representative Bùi Quang Dũng (sponsor) and actress Dương Cẩm Lynh with Best Supporting Actress/Actor - Feature film
Director Nguyễn Thanh Vân and actress Hồng Ánh with Best Leading Actress/Actor - Feature film
Cinematographer Nguyễn K'Linh and actress Trương Ngọc Ánh with Best Cinematography and Best Art Design - Feature film
Director Đào Bá Sơn and actress Minh Châu with Best Director - Feature film
Screenwriter Nguyễn Thị Hồng Ngát and cinematographer Trần Quốc Dũng with Best Screenplay - Television film and Feature film
VNPT - Vinaphone representative Trần Minh Dũng (companion brand) and journalist Đinh Trọng Tuấn with Golden Kite for Best Drama
Deputy Minister of Culture, Sports and Tourism Lê Quang Tùng and actress Trà Giang with Golden Kite for Best Feature film

Performers 
The following individuals performed at the ceremony:
Singer Ái Phương with the song Nếu anh yêu em
Giao Thời group with the song Ngày mới
Singer Viết Nguyễn with the song Trạng Quỳnh

In Memoriam 
At the beginning of the awards ceremony, the organizers took time to honor two People's Artists as follows on the occasion of 66 years of Vietnamese Revolutionary Cinema:
Cinematographer Nguyễn Thế Đoàn
Cinematographer Phạm Khắc

Controversy

My Mr. Wife'''s surprise victory over Song Lang'' 
If for comparison, the script "My Mr. Wife" is still based on a foreign background, giving the film a Golden Kite is a bit "generous". Meanwhile, "Song Lang" with the original script written by a Vietnamese author, which is a rare film that harmonizes both entertainment and art elements, was only ranked silver. Many judges felt sorry for Song Lang, who suggested that if the silver prize was awarded, no other film would be awarded the same level, to show respect for the young director's professional efforts.

Pressure on the Jury of TV category 
According to Tuổi Trẻ's source, "Quỳnh the Doll" is better than "Across the River" by less than a point, will automatically win the Golden Kite. But after that, the jury were constantly under pressure to re-mark. The ones making pressure even used the reason that "Quỳnh the Doll" had a sensitive topic, so it should be given just the Silver Kite, and let "Across the River" won the Golden Kite.

However, the jury still holds the view that once a drama is allowed to air, then it is legal. In the morning meeting on April 12, 100% of the jury members for the TV category decided to defend their opinions, disagreeing to downgrade this drama to Silver Kite.

See also 
 5th Hanoi International Film Festival
 38th National Television Festival
 2018 VTV Awards

Notes

References

External links
Thế Giới Điện Ảnh Online – Official Vietnam Cinema Association Magazine 

Vietnamese film awards
Kite Awards
Kite Awards
2018 in Vietnam
2018 in Vietnamese television